James Baiss (27 May 1909 – 17 November 1984) was an English cricketer. He played three first-class matches for Oxford University Cricket Club between 1929 and 1937. During World War II he served with the Royal Artillery. After the war he joined the Stock Exchange.

See also
 List of Oxford University Cricket Club players

References

External links
 

1909 births
1984 deaths
English cricketers
Oxford University cricketers
Sportspeople from Kensington
Cricketers from Greater London
People educated at Tonbridge School
Alumni of Brasenose College, Oxford
Military personnel from London
Royal Artillery officers
British Army personnel of World War II
Free Foresters cricketers